This is a list of lighthouses in the Channel Islands. The archipelago lies to the west of the Cotentin Peninsula in the English Channel. There are lighthouses on all of the four main islands: Alderney, Guernsey, Jersey and Sark.

Lighthouses

See also
 Lists of lighthouses and lightvessels

References

External links
 

Lists of lighthouses by dependent territory

lighthouses